Pusté Sady is a village and municipality in Galanta District of  the Trnava Region of south-west Slovakia.

History
In historical records the village was first mentioned in 1352.

Geography
The municipality lies at an elevation of 136 metres and covers an area of 8.031 km². It has a population of about 622 people.

References

External links

  Official page
http://www.statistics.sk/mosmis/eng/run.html

Villages and municipalities in Galanta District